The Conservation Plan is an important publication written by James Semple Kerr in 1982, and revised many times. It was a landmark in Australian conservation. The document "...outlines the logical processes of the Burra Charter, and how to prepare a Conservation Plan to guide and manage change to a heritage item appropriately. Subtitled, "a guide to the preparation of conservation plans for places of European cultural significance it has guided building conservation in Australia and around the world.

The Conservation Plan is widely used by heritage practitioners and property owners in Australia, and worldwide as a primary guide to the process of researching, documenting and managing historic places in accordance with the Burra Charter, through a logical process. First published by the National Trust of Australia (NSW) in 1982, it has subsequently been reprinted in expanded form over seven editions and twelve printing impressions. The concept has been adopted worldwide as a critical process for conserving heritage places, for example in the British Heritage Lottery Fund guidance note Conservation Plans for Historic Places, Wales and British Columbia.

References

External links
 Conservation Plan online edition, Australia ICOMOS > Publications, 2013
 Understanding The Burra Charter Excerpts from an Australia ICOMOS brochure explaining the principles of heritage conservation. Retrieved 15 August 2011].

Architectural history
Cultural heritage of Australia
Conservation and restoration of cultural heritage
Nature conservation in Australia